The West Mountains are a mountain range in the U.S. state of Idaho, spanning part of Boise and Payette national forests.
The range is bordered to the east by the Payette River and the North Fork Payette River, which separate the range from the Boise Mountains.

References 

Mountain ranges of Idaho